Jane Blackburn is a retired athlete who competed in a number of sports at five Paralympic Games.

At the 1972 Heidelberg Paralympics, Blackburn won gold in the table tennis Women's doubles 1A-1B alongside Barbara Anderson, and silver in the Archery women's singles 1B and Mixed St. Nicholas round team tetraplegic, alongside Anderson and Tommy Taylor. She also took bronze in the Women's St. Nicholas round tetraplegic.

Blackburn won a gold and bronze medal at the 1976 Toronto Paralympics, in the table tennis women's singles 1B and athletics women's pentathlon 1B respectively.

She again defended her table tennis singles 1B title at the 1980 Arnhem Paralympics, as well as winning lawn bowls gold and silver in the Women's Pairs 1A-1B (with Maggie McLellan) and Women's Singles 1A-1B respectively, plus a further silver in the table tennis, Women's Teams 2.

Blackburn's final Paralympic medal to date came at the 1984 New York/Stoke Mandeville Paralympics, once again in the Women's singles 1B.

References

Living people
Year of birth missing (living people)
British female archers
British female bowls players
British female swimmers
British female table tennis players
Archers at the 1972 Summer Paralympics
Archers at the 1976 Summer Paralympics
Athletes (track and field) at the 1972 Summer Paralympics
Athletes (track and field) at the 1976 Summer Paralympics
Lawn bowls players at the 1980 Summer Paralympics
Swimmers at the 1972 Summer Paralympics
Table tennis players at the 1972 Summer Paralympics
Table tennis players at the 1976 Summer Paralympics
Table tennis players at the 1980 Summer Paralympics
Table tennis players at the 1984 Summer Paralympics
Table tennis players at the 1992 Summer Paralympics
Paralympic archers of Great Britain
Paralympic athletes of Great Britain
Paralympic lawn bowls players of Great Britain
Paralympic swimmers of Great Britain
Paralympic table tennis players of Great Britain
Medalists at the 1972 Summer Paralympics
Medalists at the 1976 Summer Paralympics
Medalists at the 1980 Summer Paralympics
Medalists at the 1984 Summer Paralympics
Paralympic medalists in archery
Paralympic medalists in athletics (track and field)
Paralympic medalists in lawn bowls
Paralympic medalists in table tennis
Paralympic gold medalists for Great Britain
Paralympic silver medalists for Great Britain
Paralympic bronze medalists for Great Britain
British female javelin throwers
British female shot putters